Prapreče is a settlement in the Municipality of Vransko in central Slovenia. It lies in the valley of Merinščica Creek west of Vransko. The area is part of the traditional Styria region. Together with the municipality, Prapreče is now part of the Savinja Statistical Region.

References

External links
Prapreče at Geopedia

Populated places in the Municipality of Vransko